Osvaldas Bareikis (born 19 December 1993) is a Lithuanian Paralympic judoka. He won one of the bronze medals in the men's 73 kg event at the 2020 Summer Paralympics held in Tokyo, Japan.

In 2016, he lost his bronze medal match in the men's 66 kg event at the 2016 Summer Paralympics held in Rio de Janeiro, Brazil.

References 

Living people
1993 births
People from Ukmergė
Lithuanian male judoka
Paralympic judoka of Lithuania
Paralympic bronze medalists for Lithuania
Paralympic medalists in judo
Judoka at the 2016 Summer Paralympics
Judoka at the 2020 Summer Paralympics
Medalists at the 2020 Summer Paralympics